The Diary of Anne Frank («Дневник Анны Франк» Dnevnik Anny Frank) is a monodrama in 21 scenes for soprano and chamber orchestra, composed in 1968 and first performed in 1972. The music and libretto are by Grigory Frid, after the eponymous 1942-1944 diary.

Plot
The 13-year-old Anne Frank is hiding with her family in a house in Amsterdam from July 1942 until their arrest in August 1944. She describes the people she sees, her different moods, and her emotions in her diary, telling of her pleasure at a birthday gift, or the sight of blue sky from her window, or her awakening attraction for Peter, but also her fear and loneliness.

Description
Frid wrote his own libretto for the work, structuring the original texts to provide a rich and varied portrait of Anne and the people around her in 21 brief scenes. The opera lasts one hour.

Scenes
 Prelude
 Birthday
 School
 Conversation with Father
 Summons to the Gestapo
 The Hiding Place / The Bell Tower West
 At the Little Window
 I Was Told
 Despair
 Memory
 Dream
 Interlude
 Duet of Mr and Mrs Van Daan
 Thieves
 Recitative
 I Think of Peter
 On the Russian Front
 Razzia
 Loneliness
 Passacaglia
 Finale

The opera, composed in 1968, was first performed with piano accompaniment at the All-Union House of Composers in Moscow on either 17 or 18 May 1972.

Reception
The opera's intimate nature and chamber orchestra scale means that it works well in small spaces and using small forces. In summer 2012, Operabase listed it as the most frequently staged lyric work by a living composer over the previous five years.

Discography
 Das Tagebuch der Anne Frank (sung in German) Sandra Schwarzhaupt, soprano, Emsland Ensemble, Hans Erik Deckert, Profil PH04044,  
 The Diary of Anne Frank (sung in Russian) Eva Ben-Tsvi soprano, Bolshoi Theatre Orchestra, Andrey Chistiakov, reissued Brilliant Classics
 Das Tagebuch der Anne Frank (sung in German) Nina Maria Plangg, soprano, Jury Everhartz, conductor, sirene Operntheater, Storm Cinema

Sources

External links
 , Opera Theatre Company, Dublin, 2010. Ani Maldjian; Conductor: Andrew Synnott; Directors: Annilese Miskimmon, Ingrid Craigie
 , sireneOperntheater, Vienna, 2008. Nina Plangg; Conductor: Jury Everhartz; Director: Kristine Tornquist
Libretto in English

Compositions by Grigory Frid
1972 operas
Russian-language operas
Operas
Operas based on books
Operas set in the 20th century
Operas set in the Netherlands
Chamber operas
Cultural depictions of Anne Frank
Works based on diaries